Fereydoun Djam (1914 – 24 May 2008) was a senior Iranian army official, and the son of former Iranian prime minister Mahmoud Djam.

Career
Djam served as head of the Iranian Imperial Army Corps from 1969 to 1971. He was commissioned into the Cavalry in 1934 and had trained in the Prussian Staff College for the Wehrmacht in 1936-37 and served for a while as a mercenary officer in the Royalist force of Spain in 1938. He left the army because of professional conflicts with Mohammad Reza Pahlavi and retired in 1973.  After resignation from the army he became Iranian ambassador to Spain for a few years up to 1978. Then he moved to London. To the last government led by Shahpour Bakhtiar before revolution he was proposed to be defense minister, but according to his interview later on due to lack of authority he did not accept the position. He believed that the declaration of impartiality by army core at the last day of revolution was a betrayal. Following the revolution he did not come back to the country but during the Iran–Iraq War he was supporting the Iranian army.

Personal life
Fereydoun Djam born on 1914 in Tabriz, Iran. His father Mahmoud Djam was prime minister of Iran from  1935 to 1939. He attended in military schools in Tehran and Saint-Cyr. Later he graduated from military academy in UK. In an arranged marriage Fereydoun married to Princess Shams in 1937. They divorced after death of Reza Shah on 1944.

Legacy
In 2011, the School of Oriental and African Studies (SOAS) was awarded a gift of £2 million by the Fereydoun Djam Charitable Trust to promote Iranian studies. As part of this initiative, SOAS has introduced new scholarships in Iranian studies as well as an annual lecture series to promote diverse aspects of Iranian studies. The annual lectures are hosted by the Centre for Iranian Studies at SOAS and are named after Fereydoun’s son, Kamran Djam, who predeceased his parents in 1989.

References

1914 births
2008 deaths
National Resistance Movement of Iran politicians
Politicians from Tabriz
Ambassadors of Iran to Spain
Imperial Iranian Armed Forces four-star generals
20th-century Iranian people
21st-century Iranian people